Prince Carl Oscar of Sweden, Duke of Södermanland  (Carl Oscar Vilhelm Frederik; 14 December 1852 – 13 March 1854) was a prince of Sweden and Norway.

Biography
Born in Stockholm, Carl Oscar was the only son and younger child in the marriage of Crown Prince Charles (later King Charles XV and IV) of the United Kingdoms of Sweden and Norway (1826–1872) and Princess Louise of the Netherlands (1828–1871). He had one elder sibling, Louise of Sweden who would become Queen of Denmark.

In February 1854 the young prince suffered from measles and was prescribed a cold bath. This led to pneumonia, and the prince died when he was little over a year old. He is interred in Riddarholmskyrkan in Stockholm.

Arms

Ancestry

Source
Centuries of Selfies ISBN 9789189179639 pp 81, 134 & 166

1852 births
1854 deaths
Carl Oscar 1852
Norwegian princes
House of Bernadotte
People from Stockholm
Burials at Riddarholmen Church
Swedish people of Dutch descent
Swedish people of French descent
Dukes of Södermanland
Sons of kings
Royalty and nobility who died as children